Stavros Psycharis (1945 – 2 August 2022) was a Greek publisher and politician. He served as Civil Administrator of Mount Athos from 1996 to 2001.

Psycharis died in Porto Rafti, Greece on 2 August 2022.

References

1945 births
2022 deaths
20th-century Greek politicians
21st-century Greek politicians
Civil Administrators of Mount Athos
People from Athens